Anigozanthos is a genus of Southwest Australian plants of the bloodwort family Haemodoraceae. The 11 species and their subspecies are commonly known as kangaroo paw or catspaw, depending on their size, and the shape and color of their flowers. A further species, previously identified as Anigozanthos fuliginosus (black kangaroo paw), was separated to a monotypic genus as Macropidia fuliginosa.

The species are recognised by their unusual flowers, numerous hybrids and cultivars have been developed for cultivation and floristry in recent years; kangaroo paws are much in demand as house plants and as cut flowers. The red-and-green kangaroo paw is the floral emblem of Western Australia.

Taxonomy
The genus was first named by Jacques Labillardière, a French botanist, in his work, Relation du Voyage à la Recherche de la Pérouse, issued in 1800; he collected and described the type species, Anigozanthos rufus, during the d'Entrecasteaux expedition's visit to Southwest Australia in 1792. However, he does not provide a meaning for this name in his description. C.A. Gardener derived it from the Greek words  ánisos "unequal" and  ánthos "flower" according to La Billardiere's description of its collective petals as 'irregular' and 'in the form of a tube divided at its extremities into six unequal parts', he assumed the "g" was inserted for euphony.

The common name 'kangaroo paw' was initially given to Anigozanthos manglesii and came to be used for other species of Anigozanthos as they became known. The origin of the name 'catspaw' is uncertain, but presumed to distinguish the compact size of the plant and flowers from others of the genus. Kangaroo paws refers to a grouping of species resembling A. manglesii, with elongated red and green (or green) flowers and greater overall size.

Description

These perennials are endemic to dry sandy, siliceous areas of southwest Australia, but they occur as well in a variety of other environments and soil types. They are grown commercially in Australia, the United States, Japan and Israel.

The plant grows from short, underground, horizontal rhizomes. The length and the character of these may vary between the species: some are fleshy, others are fragile. The sap in the root system allows the plants to survive extreme dry spells. In summer, a number of species die back to the rhizome, growing back in autumn.

The plants have a basal rosette of long green to greyish-green leaves. The leaves of some species are hairy. From the heart of this roset merge long leafless stalks, which can reach 2 m, ending in a raceme of flowers. The size and height of these stalks, which can be clothed in coloured hairs, varies between the species.

The tuberous flower buds are also covered with coloured hairs, giving it a velvety aspect. These long furry hairs also determine the colour of the flower, which may range from almost black to yellow, orange and red. Some species are even dichromatic (as Anigozanthos manglesii). The tubular form of the flower bud resembles a kangaroo paw, hence its name. The flower tip spreads fanlike into six petals. Full-grown plants can have up to ten flowers at the end of each stalk.

Species
The genus comprises 11 species, some species with subspecies recognised by FloraBase as rare or endangered taxa.

Anigozanthos bicolor Endl. (little kangaroo paw)
Anigozanthos bicolor ssp. bicolor (two-coloured kangaroo paw)
Anigozanthos bicolor ssp. decrescens
Anigozanthos bicolor ssp. exstans
Anigozanthos bicolor ssp. minor
Anigozanthos flavidus DC. (tall kangaroo paw)
Anigozanthos gabrielae Domin (dwarf kangaroo paw)
Anigozanthos humilis 
Anigozanthos humilis ssp. humilis (common catspaw)
Anigozanthos humilis ssp. chrysanthus (Mogumber catspaw)
Anigozanthos humilis ssp. grandis (tall catspaw)
Anigozanthos kalbarriensis (Kalbarri catspaw)
Anigozanthos manglesii D.Don (red-and-green kangaroo paw)
Anigozanthos manglesii ssp. manglesii
Anigozanthos manglesii ssp. quadrans
Anigozanthos onycis (branched catspaw)
Anigozanthos preissii (Albany catspaw)
Anigozanthos pulcherrimus Hook. (golden kangaroo paw)
Anigozanthos rufus Labill. (red kangaroo paw)
Anigozanthos viridis Endl. 
Anigozanthos viridis subsp. viridis (green kangaroo paw)
Anigozanthos viridis subsp. terraspectans Hopper (dwarf green kangaroo paw)
Anigozanthos viridis subsp. metallica (metallic green kangaroo paw)

Commercial hybrids
The popularity of Anigozanthos, as a garden plant or commercially produced cut-flower, has led to the development of cultivars. The Australian Cultivar Registration Authority lists twenty seven registered names and descriptions of cultivars derived from the genus. A larger number of patents for these, accepted or granted 'varieties', are recorded in the Plant breeders' rights database.

Gallery

References

External links

Western Australian Herbarium: Anigozanthos Department of Environment and Conservation

 
Commelinales of Australia
Angiosperms of Western Australia
Commelinales genera